In Outer Space is the twelfth studio album by American pop band Sparks, released in April 1983 by Atlantic Records. Brothers Ron and Russell Mael of Sparks self-produced the album.

Release
In Outer Space became one of Sparks' most successful albums in the U.S. It peaked at No. 88 on the Billboard 200 albums chart, and built upon the success of the band's previous two studio albums, Angst in My Pants (1982) and Whomp That Sucker (1981). In France, the non-album single "Modesty Plays" (originally conceived for the TV series Modesty Blaise) was added and included as the final track.

"Cool Places" was released as the first single from the album and it reached No. 49 on the Billboard Hot 100. The song was a duet with the Go-Go's rhythm guitarist and backing vocalist Jane Wiedlin. Wiedlin's band was very popular, and her input gave exposure to the single, which led it to become Sparks' biggest hit in the US. "Cool Places" was extended for 12", and both formats were backed with the non-album track "Sports". The single also became the first of many entries for the band on the Billboard Hot Dance Music/Club Play chart; where it peaked at No. 13.

"All You Ever Think About Is Sex" was remixed and released as the follow-up single, but it did not chart. An extended mix was also produced and it was backed with a remixed version of the album track; "Dance Godammit" on both 7" and 12" formats.

Neither the album or the accompanying singles were successful in the UK.

Track listing

Personnel
Credits are adapted from the In Outer Space liner notes.

Sparks
 Russell Mael – Vocals
 Ron Mael – All synthesizers (Roland JP-8)

Additional musicians
 Bob Haag – Endodyne guitars and Roland guitar synthesizers, Tab cans, background vocals, and additional bass guitar
 Leslie Bohem – Bass guitar, background vocals
 David Kendrick – Drums
 James Goodwin – Additional concert keyboards
 Jane Wiedlin – guest vocals on "Cool Places" and "Lucky Me, Lucky You"

Production and artwork
 Ron Mael – producer
 Russell Mael – producer 
 Dan Lacksman – engineer
 Brian Reeves – mixing; engineer
 Marc Moulin – album coordination
 Larry Vigon – art direction and design
 Jim Shea – photography

References

External links
 

Sparks (band) albums
1983 albums
Atlantic Records albums
Carrere Records albums
Oglio Records albums
Repertoire Records albums
Synth-pop albums by American artists